was a Japanese politician and essayist. He was born in Nagano Prefecture. He was a graduate of Tokyo University of Agriculture and Technology. He was governor of Nagano Prefecture (1959-1980).

References

1906 births
1980 deaths
Governors of Nagano
Japanese essayists
Japanese Home Ministry government officials
Tokyo University of Agriculture and Technology alumni
People from Nagano Prefecture
20th-century essayists